Cruise Miles is an official loyalty program operated by cruise specialist Reader Offers Ltd. The scheme is now endorsed by a large number of leading cruise ship operators. The Cruise Miles scheme operates in the United Kingdom, is free to join and as of 2021 has over 400,000 members.

History 

Cruise Miles was launched in 2010 in order to reward customers booking with Reader Offers Ltd, which was established in 1995 by Peter Beadles. Reader Offers Ltd has been part of the cruise industry for over 25 years.

Former BBC Royal Correspondent Jennie Bond has been the face of Cruise Miles since 2012, and has featured in many of the Cruise Miles television advertising campaigns.

Collection 

Cruise Miles membership enables members to collect points when booking a cruise via Reader Offers Ltd. People will be automatically registered when booking with Reader Offers Ltd or can sign up to the scheme online or on the phone without booking a cruise. 
For each £1 spent on new bookings following the start of a client’s membership, 1 Cruise Mile will be earned, which can be redeemed at the value of 1p. Cruise Miles are automatically added to an account when a customer makes a booking. There are also opportunities for earning bonus cruise miles, such as when joining, or attending travel shows.

Redemption 

Members can choose to spend accrued Cruise Miles on each booking, or if preferred can allow them to accumulate over a number of bookings. It must then be declared by the member at the time of booking if the Cruise Miles are to be used, and no minimum spend is required. These can be redeemed in exchange for added extras such as cabin and flight upgrades, free hotel stays or car parking. Alternatively, Cruise Miles can also provide savings on the total cost of the cruise booking.

Since the introduction of Cruise Miles, over a quarter of a million members have redeemed Cruise Miles, which is the equivalent of a saving of over £9 million.

Cruise partners 

Fred.Olsen Cruise Lines
Celebrity Cruises
Cruise & Maritime Voyages
Silversea
Hurtigruten
Royal Caribbean International
Oceania Cruises
Norwegian Cruise Line
Princess Cruises
Azamara Club Cruises
Holland America Line
Seabourn
Regent Seven Seas Cruises
MSC Cruises
Voyages of Discovery
Swan Hellenic Discovery Cruising
P&O Cruises
Cunard
APT
Crystal Cruises

Controversies 

In 2014, the owner of the unrelated website cruisemiles.com, Richard Lester, was under investigation following reports that people had paid for cruise holidays they never went on. Cruisemiles.com was suspended in August 2014, with the main UK company also struck off the Companies House register in the same month for failing to file its accounts. This caused controversy for cruisemiles.travel, as many people confused the two companies, even though they are unrelated.

References

External links 
 

Tourism in England
Cruise lines
Reward websites